The men's triple jump event at the 2005 European Athletics U23 Championships was held in Erfurt, Germany, at Steigerwaldstadion on 15 and 17 July.

Medalists

Results

Final
17 July

Qualifications
15 July
Qualifying 16.20 or 12 best to the Final

Group A

Group B

Participation
According to an unofficial count, 16 athletes from 10 countries participated in the event.

 (1)
 (1)
 (2)
 (1)
 (1)
 (3)
 (2)
 (1)
 (2)
 (2)

References

Triple jump
Triple jump at the European Athletics U23 Championships